Kannagi sometimes spelled Kannaki, is a legendary Tamil woman who forms the central character of the Tamil epic Cilappatikaram. Kannagi is described as the chaste woman who stays with her husband despite his unfaithfulness, their attempt to rebuild their marriage after her husband had lost everything but repented, how her husband is falsely framed then punished without the due checks and processes of justice. Kannagi proves and protests the injustice, then curses the king and city of Madurai leading to the death of the unjust Pandyan King of Madurai, who had wrongfully put her husband Kovalan to death. The society that had made her suffer, suffers in retribution as the city Madurai is burnt to the ground because of her curse. In the Chera (Kerala) and Tamil tradition, Kannagi has been deified as the symbol – sometimes as goddess – of chastity, with sculptures or reliefs in Hindu temples iconographically reminding the visitor of her breaking her anklet or tearing her bleeding breast and throwing it at the city.

The earliest Tamil epic Silappadikaram written by Jain prince Ilango Adigal features her as the central character.

Text

The Kannagi story first appears in the Sangam era poem Narrinai 312. A more extended version appears in the post-Sangam era Tamil epic in Silappatikaram ("Epic of the Anklet).

Legend

Kannagi was the daughter of the merchant and ship captain Manayakan from Puhar. She marries the son of Macattuvan, Kovalan, whose family were sea traders and had the sea goddess Manimekalai as patron deity. Later, Kovalan met a dancer Madhavi and had an affair with her, which prompted him to spend all his wealth on the dancer. At last, penniless, Kovalan realised his mistake and returned to his wife Kannagi. Kovalan hoped to recoup his fortunes by trade in Madurai, by selling the precious anklet of Kannagi.

Madurai was ruled by Pandya king Nedunj Cheliyan I. When Kovalan tried to sell the anklet, it was mistaken for a stolen anklet of the queen. Kovalan was accused of having stolen the anklet and was immediately beheaded by the king without trial. When Kannagi was informed of this, she became furious, and set out to prove her husband's innocence to the king.

Kannagi came to the king's court, broke open the anklet seized from Kovalan and showed that it contained rubies, as opposed to the queen's anklets which contained pearls. Realizing the error, the king committed suicide in shame, after having caused such a huge miscarriage of justice. Kannagi uttered a curse that the entire city of Madurai be burnt. The capital city of Pandyas was set ablaze resulting in huge losses. However, at the request of Goddess Meenakshi, she calmed down and later, attained salvation. The story forms the crux of Cilappatikaram written by poet Ilango Adigal.

Worship

Kannagi or Kannaki Amman is eulogized as the epitome of chastity and is worshiped as a goddess in select regions. She is worshiped as goddess Pattini in Sri Lanka by the Sinhalese Buddhists, Kannaki Amman by the Sri Lankan Tamil Hindus and as Kodungallur Bhagavathy & Aatukal Bhagavathy in the South Indian state of Kerala. Keralites believe Kannaki to be an incarnation of Goddess Bhadrakali who reached Kodungalloor and attained salvation in the Kodungalloor temple.

In popular culture

A Tamil epic film Kannagi directed by R.S Mani released in 1942. This was the first Tamil film based on the epic Silapadhigaaram. A similar second movie named Poompuhar released later in 1964. A statue of Kannagi holding her anklet, depicting a scene from Cilappatikaram was installed on Marina Beach, Chennai. It was removed in December 2001 citing reasons that it hindered traffic. The statue was reinstalled in June 2006.

A Sinhala film called Paththini was released on 5 May 2016 in Sri Lanka. The role of the goddess Paththni or Kannagi was played by Pooja Umashankar.

A famous television serial named Upasana was broadcast on Doordarshan in the early 1990s and was based on the twin novels Silappatikaram & Manimekalai.

See also
 Silappathigaram
 Kannaki Amman
 Kodungallur Bhagavathy Temple
 Mangala Devi Kannagi Temple
 Attukal Temple
 Thambiluvil Sri Kannaki amman temple
 Lady Meng Jiang

References

Bibliography

External links

 R.K.K. Rajarajan (2000) Dance of Ardhanārī as Pattinī-Kaṉṉaki: With special reference to the Cilappatikāram. Berliner Indologische Studien, Berlin, Vol. 13/14, pp. 401-14. .
 R.K.K. Rajarajan (2012) Dance of Ardhanārī. A Historiographical Retrospection. In Tiziana Lorenzetti and Fabio Scialpi eds. Glimpses of Indian History and Art.  Reflections on the Past, Perspectives for the Future. Roma: SAPIENZA Università Editrice, pp. 233-270. .

Characters in Silappatikaram
Hindu goddesses
Tamil deities